Peace negotiations between the Ukrainian State and the RSFSR took place between the Ukrainian State and the Russian Socialist Federative Soviet Republic, during the period May 23 – October 4, 1918 at a peace conference in Kiev.

For the Ukrainian side, the negotiations with the RSFSR were dictated by the need to solve the problems that arose as a result of the collapse of the Russian state and Ukraine's self-determination. For the Russian side, they were a forced measure, to which it was obliged by the Treaty of Brest-Litovsk (Berestei peace treaty) of March 3, 1918 between the RSFSR and the states of the Quadruple Alliance (1915–1918). Under the terms of the  Brest-Litovsk Treaty, Russia renounced territorial claims across a swathe of land on or near its borders, including Ukraine.

The result of the negotiations was the conclusion of a preliminary peace treaty on July 12, 1918.

The progress of negotiations 
Negotiations were conducted in the form of plenary meetings, where all important issues were resolved, agreements were concluded. In addition, during the conference, depending on the issues under consideration, relevant commissions on political, economic, financial, and cultural issues worked to prepare relevant materials for the plenary sessions. The Russian delegation was headed by C. Rakovsky and D. Manuelsky, the Ukrainian one by the Chief Justice of the Ukrainian State Serhiy Shelukhin. From the Ukrainian side, the following participated in the negotiations: I. Kistyakivskyi, O. Slyvinskyi, O. Eichelman, H. Baranovskyi, A. Svitsyn, P. Linnychenko, O. Shulgin, V. Bronskyi, G. Lerhe, S. Gutnyk, Ye. Sakovich, P. Kholodny, M. Mohylyansky, and others.

On June 12, 1918, a preliminary peace treaty was concluded. According to its terms, combat operations at the front were to stop during negotiations, and the conditions for the repatriation of citizens of both states, the restoration of railway connections and the return to Ukraine of rolling stock of railways that had been driven to Russia in the spring of 1918 were determined. According to the agreement, on June 22, 1918, the Ukrainian government adopted a resolution on the establishment of consulates-general of the Ukrainian State in Moscow and Petrograd (now St. Petersburg) and 30 consular agencies in other cities of Russia. Russian missions were opened in Ukraine: consulates-general in Kiev, Kharkov, Odessa and consular agencies in Kamianets-Podilskyi, Chernigov, Zhytomyr, and Poltava.

Russian-Ukrainian border 
The main goal of the conference was to work out the terms of the peace treaty. The problem of establishing state borders was especially carefully discussed. In fact, all the subsequent plenary sessions in one way or another boiled down to heated discussions on this issue. Deliberately slowing down the progress of the negotiations, the Russian delegation expressed disagreement with the Ukrainian border project, considering it offensive and expansive towards Russia. For its part, the Ukrainian side was not satisfied with the Russian project, the purpose of which was to satisfy the great power claims of the RSFSR and its Bolshevik government, and to destroy the territorial and economic integrity of the Ukrainian State. Disputes between the parties on this matter brought the negotiations to an impasse.

Other questions 
A number of issues were considered at the negotiations, including economic, trade, financial and settlement, division of debts and property of the former Russian Empire. On July 7, an agreement was reached on the exchange of goods. On July 25, another agreement was achieved about the division of property and debts of the former Russian empire. The Ukrainian State declared its rights to part of the property and gold fund of the former Russian Empire and demanded the complete return of cultural goods exported from Ukraine to Russia, which represented its cultural and historical heritage — the Ministry of Confessions of the Ukrainian State compiled lists of property of cultural significance that had to be returned to Ukraine. However, these agreements were not practically implemented. The consideration of many issues was delayed because of delays in negotiations due to the Russian representatives. At the beginning of October 1918, the negotiations were interrupted without reaching a conclusion. The goal had been to conclude a peace treaty between the two states. During the negotiations, the approaches of both parties corresponded to the political courses of the governments of both states.

Final fate of the negotiations 
With the annulment of the Brest Peace Treaty of the RSFSR with the states of the Quadruple Union, on November 13, 1918, the sides were freed from the implementation of both the Brest agreements and those reached during the Ukrainian-Russian negotiations.

See also 
 2022 Russia–Ukraine peace negotiations

Sources and literature 
Лупандін O. I. (Lupandin O. I.)  Мирні переговори між Українською Державою та РСФРР 1918 (Peace negotiations between the Ukrainian State and the RSFSR 1918) – Encyclopedia of the history of Ukraine: in 10 volumes / edited by: V. A. Smoliy (chairman) and others. ; Institute of History of Ukraine, National Academy of Sciences of Ukraine. — K.: Naukova dumka, 2009. — T. 6: La — Mi. — 784 p. : fig. — ISBN 978-966-00-1028-1..
Мирні переговори між Українською Державою та РСФРР 1918 (Peace negotiations between the Ukrainian State and the RSFSR in 1918): Collection of documents and materials. K.–New York–Philadelphia, 1999.
Дорошенко Д (Doroshenko D.) Історія України (History of Ukraine): 1917–1923, vol. 2. Uzhhorod, 1932
Боєчко В. та ін. (Boyechko V. and others.) Кордони України: Історична ретроспектива та сучасний стан (Borders of Ukraine: Historical retrospective and current state). K., 1994
Лупандін O. I. (Lupandin O. I.) Українсько-російські мирні переговори 1918 (Ukrainian-Russian peace negotiations of 1918). In the book: Historical notebooks. K., 1994

Russia-Ukraine
Russia–Ukraine relations